The 2005–06 Washington Wizards season was the team's 45th in the NBA. They began the season hoping to improve upon their 45-37 output from the previous season. They came up three games short of matching it, finishing 42-40, but qualified for the playoffs for the second straight season. In January 2006, the MCI Center's name was changed to Verizon Center, which lasted until 2017.

Draft picks
 wizards first time drafting two russian basketball players ever in history

Roster

Regular season

Standings

Record vs. opponents

Game log

Playoffs

|- align="center" bgcolor="#ffcccc"
| 1
| April 22
| @ Cleveland
| L 86–97
| Gilbert Arenas (26)
| Antawn Jamison (7)
| Antonio Daniels (6)
| Quicken Loans Arena20,562
| 0–1
|- align="center" bgcolor="#ccffcc"
| 2
| April 25
| @ Cleveland
| W 89–84
| Gilbert Arenas (30)
| Caron Butler (9)
| Gilbert Arenas (6)
| Quicken Loans Arena20,562
| 1–1
|- align="center" bgcolor="#ffcccc"
| 3
| April 28
| Cleveland
| L 96–97
| Gilbert Arenas (34)
| Caron Butler (11)
| Daniels, Jamison (3)
| Verizon Center20,173
| 1–2
|- align="center" bgcolor="#ccffcc"
| 4
| April 30
| Cleveland
| W 106–96
| Gilbert Arenas (34)
| Jared Jeffries (11)
| Gilbert Arenas (6)
| Verizon Center20,173
| 2–2
|- align="center" bgcolor="#ffcccc"
| 5
| May 3
| @ Cleveland
| L 120–121 (OT)
| Gilbert Arenas (44)
| Caron Butler (11)
| Antonio Daniels (7)
| Quicken Loans Arena20,562
| 2–3
|- align="center" bgcolor="#ffcccc"
| 6
| May 5
| Cleveland
| L 113–114 (OT)
| Gilbert Arenas (36)
| Caron Butler (20)
| Gilbert Arenas (11)
| Verizon Center20,173
| 2–4
|-

Player statistics
fix this

Season
Rk Player Age G GS MP FG FGA FG% 3P 3PA 3P% FT FTA FT% ORB DRB TRB AST STL BLK TOV PF PTS
1 Gilbert Arenas 24 80 80 3384 746 1668 .447 199 540 .369 655 799 .820 59 221 280 484 161 25 297 286 2346

2 Antawn Jamison 29 82 80 3288 660 1494 .442 147 373 .394 217 297 .731 167 598 765 158 90 12 137 189 1684

3 Caron Butler 25 75 54 2708 494 1086 .455 41 120 .342 289 332 .870 114 352 466 186 127 18 175 238 1318

4 Antonio Daniels 30 80 17 2283 230 550 .418 23 101 .228 284 336 .845 19 153 172 284 52 8 89 96 767

5 Brendan Haywood 26 79 70 1879 222 432 .514 0 0  131 224 .585 200 267 467 46 30 104 97 232 575

6 Jared Jeffries 24 77 77 1951 187 415 .451 16 50 .320 99 168 .589 164 215 379 148 58 50 99 223 489

7 Etan Thomas 27 71 9 1121 131 246 .533 0 0  75 125 .600 99 180 279 14 20 68 51 148 337

8 Jarvis Hayes 24 21 13 516 77 183 .421 17 47 .362 25 30 .833 19 57 76 27 16 1 22 38 196

9 Chucky Atkins 31 28 2 552 66 174 .379 33 92 .359 22 31 .710 12 33 45 69 14 0 30 58 187

10 Donell Taylor 23 51 1 465 53 136 .390 4 17 .235 30 43 .698 16 37 53 45 30 4 34 47 140

11 Michael Ruffin 29 76 4 1010 34 77 .442 0 2 .000 37 74 .500 122 149 271 27 33 31 38 179 105

12 Andray Blatche 19 29 0 175 26 67 .388 3 13 .231 10 12 .833 12 26 38 10 5 7 12 36 65

13 Calvin Booth 29 33 2 250 20 47 .426 1 2 .500 5 9 .556 19 33 52 12 9 9 8 44 46

14 Awvee Storey 28 25 1 116 16 41 .390 3 7 .429 8 14 .571 8 14 22 4 3 1 5 22 43

15 Billy Thomas 30 17 0 131 13 40 .325 10 30 .333 2 2 1.000 5 9 14 9 10 1 6 19 38

Playoffs
Rk Player Age G GS MP FG FGA FG% 3P 3PA 3P% FT FTA FT% ORB DRB TRB AST STL BLK TOV PF PTS
1 Gilbert Arenas 24 6 6 284 65 140 .464 20 46 .435 54 70 .771 7 26 33 32 13 4 20 21 204

2 Antawn Jamison 29 6 6 253 42 99 .424 10 32 .313 21 27 .778 9 34 43 18 6 2 11 23 115

3 Caron Butler 25 6 6 262 42 101 .416 3 14 .214 24 29 .828 16 47 63 16 12 4 14 31 111

4 Antonio Daniels 30 6 0 216 28 52 .538 3 11 .273 20 22 .909 2 15 17 20 3 1 10 4 79

5 Jared Jeffries 24 6 6 215 17 43 .395 1 7 .143 13 17 .765 20 17 37 9 1 7 11 19 48

6 Brendan Haywood 26 6 6 155 15 22 .682 0 0  13 25 .520 7 12 19 5 2 11 7 22 43

7 Etan Thomas 27 3 0 18 2 5 .400 0 0  2 4 .500 2 4 6 0 2 2 0 3 6

8 Billy Thomas 30 3 0 14 0 7 .000 0 4 .000 2 4 .500 0 1 1 0 0 0 0 3 2

9 Michael Ruffin 29 6 0 70 1 2 .500 0 0  0 2 .000 6 10 16 4 1 2 2 10 2

10 Donell Taylor 23 1 0 3 0 1 .000 0 1 .000 0 0  0 0 0 1 1 0 0 0 0

Awards and records
 Gilbert Arenas, All-NBA Third Team

Transactions
Transactions listed are from July 1, 2005 to June 30, 2006.

August 2, 2005- Traded Kwame Brown and Laron Profit to the Los Angeles Lakers for Chucky Atkins and Caron Butler. Signed Antonio Daniels as a free agent.

September 7, 2005- Signed Calvin Booth as a free agent.

October 3, 2005- Signed Awvee Storey as a free agent. Signed Billy Thomas as a free agent.

November 10, 2005- Signed Donell Taylor as a free agent.

January 17, 2006- Waived Chucky Atkins.

February 24, 2006- Signed Billy Thomas to two 10-day contracts, then signed to a contract for the rest of the season.

June 28, 2006- Drafted Oleksiy Pecherov in the 1st round (18th pick) of the 2006 NBA Draft. Drafted Vladimir Veremeenko in the 2nd round (48th pick) of the 2006 NBA Draft.

References

Washington Wizards seasons
Wash
Wash